Ichoria is a genus of moths in the subfamily Arctiinae. The genus was erected by Arthur Gardiner Butler in 1876.

Species
 Ichoria chalcomedusa Druce, 1893
 Ichoria chrostosomides Schaus, 1905
 Ichoria demona Druce, 1897
 Ichoria improcera Draudt, 1915
 Ichoria maura Draudt, 1915
 Ichoria mexicana Draudt, 1931
 Ichoria multigutta Schaus, 1884
 Ichoria pyrrhonota Zerny, 1931
 Ichoria quadrigutta Walker, 1854
 Ichoria semiopaca Dognin, 1906
 Ichoria thyrassia Zerny, 1931
 Ichoria tricincta Herrich-Schäffer, 1855
 Ichoria virescens Dognin, 1914

References

External links

Arctiinae